Bumper Films, Inc. was a children's stop motion animation studio based in Bristol, United Kingdom. They were best known for producing the original series of Fireman Sam, which aired from 1987 to 1994 in the UK. They also produced Joshua Jones, which aired briefly during 1992,  Starhill Ponies, which aired from 1998 until 2002, and Rocky Hollow, which aired from 1983 to 1987.

After finishing production on Starhill Ponies, the company became dormant. A stake in the Fireman Sam brand was sold by owners S4C to Gullane Entertainment in December 2001.

List of shows

References

British animation studios
Mass media companies established in 1982
Mass media companies disestablished in 2002
1982 establishments in the United Kingdom
2002 disestablishments in the United Kingdom
Mattel
HIT Entertainment